Shriti Vadera, Baroness Vadera,  (born 23 June 1962) is a Ugandan-born British investment banker, and has been chair of Prudential plc since January 2021, having joined the board in May 2020. Until September 2009, she was a government minister jointly for the Department for Business, Innovation and Skills and the Cabinet Office. She was chair of Santander UK from March 2015 to October 2020, the first woman to head a major British bank.

Early life
Vadera was born in Uganda in 1962 to Indian Gujarati parents.

She is from a family who owned a small tea plantation but fled to India in 1972 following the Ugandan government's expulsion of Ugandan Asians, and then later to the UK. She was educated at Northwood College before taking a degree in philosophy, Politics, and Economics at Somerville College, Oxford.

Private sector career
For over 14 years Vadera was employed at investment bank UBS Warburg, where her work included advising governments of developing countries, and debt relief and restructuring. She also played a role in the partial privatisation of South African Telecom.

Government adviser and minister
Vadera was on the Council of Economic Advisers at HM Treasury from 1999 to 2007, where she led on policy for business, competition innovation, productivity and international finance and development issues and the management of the Government's shareholdings, asset sales and public private partnerships for infrastructure.

Following his appointment as Prime Minister in June 2007, Gordon Brown appointed her as Parliamentary Under-Secretary of State in the Department for International Development. As she was not a member of either of the Houses of Parliament, she was created a life peer on 11 July 2007 as Baroness Vadera, of Holland Park in the Royal Borough of Kensington & Chelsea. The Sunday Times reported that the Cabinet Secretary "flatly refus[ed] to allow her to cross the threshold of No 10 as policy enforcer" and "no Permanent Secretary could stand her" – although the Cabinet Secretary denied making these comments.

Following criticism of her working style Stephen Alambritis, of the Federation of Small Businesses (also a Merton Labour councillor) said: “If the Civil Service is complaining about her, then probably more ministers should be like her; she gets things done.” 

After six months as a Minister in International Development, she was moved to the Department for Business, Enterprise and Regulatory Reform. In October 2008, she also became a Parliamentary Secretary in the Cabinet Office.

In January 2009 she gave an interview on ITV's Lunchtime News, which concluded:
Alastair Stewart: "Final and briefest thought possible – you're a former banker and business person yourself and now a minister – when will we see the green shoots of recovery?
Baroness Vadera: "Well, it's a very uncertain world right now globally but I wouldn't want to be the one predicting it. I am seeing a few green shoots but it's a little bit too early to say exactly how they'll grow."

Her reply generated commentary from a number of sources, including shadow chancellor George Osborne and former chancellor Norman Lamont, who first used the phrase "green shoots" in 1991. Lamont said: "It is extremely premature to use a phrase like that."

Later that year the Evening Standard reported that Vadera was instrumental in the creation of an unprecedented banking rescue package. On 24 September 2009, it was announced that she would be stepping down as minister to take up a new role advising the G20.

Vadera has been on a leave of absence from the House of Lords since December 2011.

Post-government career 
In April 2010, the Financial Times reported that Vadera had taken up a consultancy to give strategic advice in restructuring Dubai World's US$26 billion debt. In July, the Daily Telegraph reported Vadera had become consultant to Singaporean investment company Temasek.

"The reason people like Shriti are getting these offers is because there are very few people who understand the international finance world and the geopolitical world at a time when the financial world clearly has some issues with the political world." said Martin Armstrong of recruitment consultants Somerton Partners.

In December 2010, she was appointed to the boards of BHP Billiton and AstraZeneca as a non-executive director. Shriti Vadera was on the Astra Zeneca Board until December 2018. She stepped down from the BHP Biliton Board in October 2020.

In December 2014, it was announced that she would become non-executive chairman of Santander UK, replacing Terence Burns. She joined the board in January 2015 and succeeded Burns on 30 March 2015, and stepped down in October 2020.

In 2016, she was included in that year's list of the BBC's 100 Women.

On 28 April 2021 Vadera was appointed chair of the Royal Shakespeare Company, the first woman and person of colour in the role.

Notes

References

External links

 parliamentary profile

Living people
1962 births
Ugandan emigrants to the United Kingdom
Ugandan people of Indian descent
British Hindus
British women bankers
British economists
British women economists
Alumni of Somerville College, Oxford
Labour Party (UK) life peers
British special advisers
British politicians of Indian descent
Labour Party (UK) officials
Members of the Privy Council of the United Kingdom
Gujarati people
British people of Gujarati descent
Fellows of Somerville College, Oxford
Naturalised citizens of the United Kingdom
BBC 100 Women
Life peeresses created by Elizabeth II
People educated at Northwood College